Robert Bintz (16 February 1930 - 4 September 2022) was a former Luxembourgian cyclist. He competed in the individual and team road race events at the 1948 Summer Olympics. He also rode in the 1951 Tour de France.

References

External links
 

1930 births
2022 deaths
Luxembourgian male cyclists
Olympic cyclists of Luxembourg
Cyclists at the 1948 Summer Olympics
People from Mamer